Manuel Turizo Zapata, better known as Manuel Turizo and by the acronym MTZ, is a Colombian singer. Born and raised in Montería, he started making music at 13. He first became popular with his song "Una Lady Como Tú" (2016). He made his debut album ADN on August 23, 2019. Turizo's music contains influences from pop music, trap, and vallenato and his vocal range has been classified as baritone. His most well known song is his 2022 single "La Bachata".

Career

2000–2015: Early life and musical beginnings
Manuel Turizo grew up in the Colombian coastal town of Montería and began making music at age thirteen. When Turizo was born, his parents gifted a guitar and microphone to his then-two-year-old brother Julian "so he would not get jealous" of the attention they were giving to the newborn Manuel. Years later, Turizo attempted to learn to play his brother's guitar but felt he did not have the aptitude for it, and thus began developing his singing voice. His original goal was to be a veterinarian, but decided to pursue music as a career after taking singing lessons with a Cuban music teacher. As a child, he sang while his brother played guitar along with their favorite songs. Manuel began writing songs while his brother earned his post-graduate degree in Medellin.

2016–present: "Una Lady Como Tú", success, and ADN
He is best known for his hit single "Una Lady Como Tú" (2016), which granted him widespread popularity in Latin America; the music video for the song has, as of June 2020, received over 1.4 billion views on YouTube. Within a year of its release, "Una Lady Como Tú" was streamed more than 235 million times on Spotify. This hit was followed by "Bésame" (2017) in which he collaborated with Puerto Rican reggaeton singer Valentino. The success of these singles led Billboard to include Turizo in the magazine's list of "10 Latin Artists To Watch in 2018". 

In September 2018, Turizo achieved his first Billboard Hot 100-charting hit with his collaboration with Ozuna on the single "Vaina Loca". The song peaked at number 94 and stayed on the chart for two weeks. In October 2018, he collaborated with Mau y Ricky on the single "Desconocidos". In March 2019, his song "Sola" became first number one song on the Billboard Latin Airplay chart. He released his debut album, ADN on August 23, 2019, which featured collaborations with Zion & Lennox, Noriel, Ozuna, Darell, Nicky Jam, Sech, and Anuel AA. ADN peaked at number eight on the Billboard Hot Latin Albums chart. In September 2019, Turizo was named as the first Latin "global priority artist" by the French streaming service Deezer. He performed a virtual concert with Billboard on March 25, 2020 while in quarantine during the COVID-19 pandemic to raise money for the non-profit organization MusiCares. The concert consisted of a cappella renditions of the songs "Una Lady Como Tú" and "Déjala Que Vuelva".

Artistry
Manuel Turizo comes from a family of musical talent: his father and his brother Julián Turizo are musicians. The two brothers form a duo in which Manuel sings and Julián plays the ukulele. In addition to reggaeton, Turizo has also experimented with trap, R&B, and vallenato. His vocals have been described by Billboard as "sultry and deep" and his vocal range has been classified as baritone. Turizo cites Pablo Alborán and Bruno Mars as his biggest musical influences. He also lists Luis Fonsi, Shakira, Sin Bandera, Justin Bieber and Chayanne as important musicians in his musical development.

Discography

 ADN (2019)
 Dopamina (2021)
 2000 (2023)

Awards and nominations

References

2000 births
Living people
People from Montería
21st-century Colombian male singers
Colombian reggaeton musicians
Sony Music Latin artists